Willard Curtis Hyatt (June 15, 1883 – April 10, 1967) was an American college football player and coach and college basketball player. An All-American basketball player at Yale University in 1904–05, he was part of the first group of college basketball players to be honored as such, and it occurred during his senior year. The Helms Athletic Foundation, which began in 1936, retroactively named the All-American teams from 1905 to 1935. Between 1905 and 1929, the Helms All-American teams are considered to be consensus selections. Following is graduation from Yale in June 1905, Hyatt served as the head football coach at Sewanee: The University of the South for one season, in the fall of 1905, compiling a record of 4–2–1.

Hyatt was born on June 15, 1883, in Meriden, Connecticut, to Isaac Beach and Jennie Bishop Hyatt. In 1908, he joined the firm of Little, Somers, & Hyatt Co., dealers of home decorations and artist supplies, later serving as president until his retirement around 1957. He died on April 10, 1967, at Meriden Hospital in Meriden, following a short illness.

Head coaching record

References

External links 
 

1883 births
1967 deaths
American men's basketball players
Centers (basketball)
Sewanee Tigers football coaches
Yale Bulldogs football players
Yale Bulldogs men's basketball players
All-American college men's basketball players
Sportspeople from New Haven, Connecticut
Coaches of American football from Connecticut
Players of American football from New Haven, Connecticut
Basketball players from New Haven, Connecticut